"Dark December" is an American television play broadcast on April 30, 1959 as part of the CBS television series, Playhouse 90.  The cast includes Barry Sullivan, Michael Landon, James Whitmore, and Warren Beatty. Franklin Schaffner was the director and Merle Miller the writer.

Plot
Set in December 1944, during the Battle of the Bulge, a military doctor takes over a Franciscan seminary in Bastogne and tries to convert it into a hospital.

Cast
The cast includes the following:

 Barry Sullivan - Capt. Schuyler "Sky" Hobart
 Lili Darvas - Belgian Woman
 Richard Beymer - LeRoy Cadman
 Michael Landon - Booth Latham
 James Whitmore - Major Abe Kasner
 Warren Beatty - Wally
 Paul Burke - Farley
 Sasha Harden - Konrad
 Barry Cahill - Hank Gaines
 Sam Edwards - The Captain
 Ronny Howard - The Boy
 Brian Hutton - Soldier
 Robert Carson - Soldier
 Ray Foster - Soldier
 Richard Clair - Soldier
 Robert Easton - Soldier
 Lew Brown - Soldier
 Robert Sorrells - Soldier
 Dee Pollock - Soldier
 Arlette Clark - Nun
 Gerry Gaylor - Nun
 Lisa Pons - Nun
 Mary Andre - Nun

Production
The program aired on April 30, 1959, on the CBS television series Playhouse 90. Merle Miller was the writer and Franklin Schaffner the director.

References

External links

1959 American television episodes
Playhouse 90 (season 3) episodes
1959 television plays